Khandaker Abdul Baten (17 May 1946 – 21 January 2019) was a Bangladesh Awami League politician and a member of Parliament from Tangail-6.

Early life

Baten completed his education to the undergraduate level earning a B.A. with honours.

Career

Baten was a member of the Mukti Bahini during the Bangladesh Liberation War in 1971. He was a politician of the Jatiya Samajtantrik Dal party who joined the Bangladesh Awami League in 1992, taking with him his followers. Some of the local Bangladesh Awami League politicians expressed disappointment when he joined. He lost the Tangail-6 (Nagarpur-Delduar) constituency election to Gautam Chakroborty, the Bangladesh Nationalist Party candidate, in 1996 and 2001. An inter Party feud led Bangladesh Awami League politicians to contest the polls as independent candidates costing Baten important votes. He was elected to Parliament in the 2008 Bangladeshi general election. He served on the Parliamentary Standing Committee on the Agriculture Ministry.

References

1946 births
2019 deaths
Awami League politicians
9th Jatiya Sangsad members
10th Jatiya Sangsad members